The 2001 Purefoods Tender Juicy Hotdogs season was the 14th season of the franchise in the Philippine Basketball Association (PBA).

Draft picks

Transactions

Occurrences
Coach Eric Altamirano returns to the Purefoods bench as their head coach at the beginning of the season. Altamirano brings along Ryan Gregorio as his assistant coach. He replaces Derrick Pumaren, who decided to move to another team and will handle the coaching chores for Tanduay Rhum Masters.

Roster

 Team Manager: Rene Pardo

Elimination round

Games won

References

Magnolia Hotshots seasons
Purefoods